The Minister of Higher Education and Research (formerly Minister of Higher Education, Research and Innovation or ) is a cabinet position in the French Government overseeing university-level education and research. The ministry is headquartered  in the 5th arrondissement of Paris. The current Minister of Higher Education is Frédérique Vidal.

The Ministry is one of the sponsors of the Irène Joliot-Curie Prize, which is awarded to women scientists who have distinguished themselves by the quality of their research.

In October2021, the ministry released an official translation of its second plan for open science.

See also 
 Ministry of National Education for all levels of public education, including universities.

References

External links
 Ministry of Higher Education and Research 

Higher education
France
Education in France